Casino was an electoral district of the Legislative Assembly in the Australian state of New South Wales originally created in 1930 and named after Casino. The 1929 redistribution increased the number of seats in the rural zone, and Casino was created from parts of Tenterfield and Clarence both of which were held by the Country Party. It was abolished in 1968, recreated in 1971 and abolished again in 1981.

Members for Casino

Election results

References

Constituencies established in 1930
1930 establishments in Australia
Constituencies disestablished in 1968
1968 disestablishments in Australia
Constituencies established in 1971
1971 establishments in Australia
Constituencies disestablished in 1981
1981 disestablishments in Australia